Vanni forest is a heavy forest which covers the Vanni area and most part (approximately 75%) of the Northern province of Sri Lanka. This Jungle is spread from Omanthai in south to Paranthan in north. From west and east, the sea was the boundary. This jungle played very significant role in Sri Lankan history. This forest locate in dry-zone area. Biodiversity lower than other forest. 300,000 people living near forest area.

People 

This area was situated between Sinhalese kingdom from south and Tamil ruled Jaffna kingdom from north. Small groups of Sinhalese and Tamils were established in Vanni. It bring the ethnic balance to the area. Sinhalese settlements were in the southern interior zone of the jungle. Tamils were settled in northern coastal zones   A group was controlled by a chief selected by the group. Chiefs of Tamil people was called as Vanni chieftain and Sinhala chiefs was called as Wanniarachchi. Vanniar chieftain paid tribute to the Jaffna kingdom.

Historical importance 
This jungle created resistance to the civilizations in ancient kingdoms in Sri Lanka. Giant's Tank area in Mannar District by King Dhatusena, Eropathana in Vavuniya District, Padawiya area in Anuradhapura District and Mullaitivu District by King Moggallana II proves that the Kingdom of Rajarata, the golden civilization of ancient Sri Lanka is spread to south boundary of the forest. 
This area was situated between later Rajarata and Jafna Kingdom. Vanni forest stood as heavy barrier to the rising conflict between Sinhalese and Tamils and assured protection to the Jafna Kingdom from natives. After the falling of Kingdom of Rajarata in the 12th century due to the Kalinga Magha invasion this area wasn't part of the Rajarata. In 1323 Pandyan's Jaffna administrative center became independent Jaffna kingdom due to the lack of influence from Pandyan who engaged in a battle with Muslim of the Delhi Sultanate. The last Pandyan ruler of Madurai was expelled in 1323 by Malik Kafur. Within 125 years of establishing the Jaffna kingdom, it lost the control of Vanni area due to lack of support from Pandyans and rising the power of Sinhala Kingdom in south. It would appear that by 13th century Tamils withdrew from the Vanni. In 1450 Chempaha Perumal, adopted son of king Parakramabâhu VI of Kotte invaded the Vanni area and Jaffna Kingdom to bring them under the control of Kotte. After the falling of Kotte Kingdom, small groups again settled in Vanni. But they paid tribute either to  Jafna Kingdom or Kingdom of Kandy.

Sri Lankan Civil war period LTTE control this area until 2008. Most of civil war battle, between Sri Lankan Army and the Liberation Tigers of  Tamil Eelaam. Modern day forest coverage low because deforestation.

Settlements in 20th century 

In 1936, Paranthan town was created and started establishing new colonies in Vanni Forest. New towns like Kilinochchi, Mankulam, Puliyankulam was colonized by clearing the forest. This affected ethnic balance in Vanni area which was between Rajarata and Jafna Kingdom. After independent from British, Sinhalese started colonies to neutralize the ethnic balance. This led to another wave of forest clearing.

References

Sri Lankan Tamil history
Forests of Sri Lanka
Geography of Northern Province, Sri Lanka